Welf VII (c. 1135 – 11 or 12 September 1167) was the only son of Welf VI, Duke of Spoleto and Margrave of Tuscany, and Uta, daughter of Godfrey of Calw, count palatine of the Rhine. He was a member of the House of Welf. 

His father inherited the family's estates in Swabia, including the prominent counties of Altdorf and Ravensburg, which he gave to Welf. Welf, however, spent much of his time managing the Italian possessions while his father stayed in Swabia. Both Welfs supported Frederick Barbarossa as king of Germany and the younger Welf (VII) accompanied him on his Italian campaigns, starting in 1154. In 1160, he was made duke of Spoleto by the emperor. Between 1164 and 1166, he was a central theme in the notable Stuafen-Welf feud between his father and Hugh of Tübingen, which the emperor himself resolved. 

He was a participant in the campaign of 1167, in which malaria devastated the army and forced the emperor back over the Alps. Welf was a victim of the malaria and died at Siena. He was buried in Steingaden Abbey in Bavaria, where his father was also later buried. The death of Welf (and Frederick IV) allowed his cousin Frederick I to exercise power directly in Swabia and accept the autonomy of the Lombard communes.

References

Sources

 Thomas Zotz (Editor), Andreas Schmauder (Editor), Johannes Kuber (Editor). Von Den Welfen Zu Den Staufern: Der Tod Welfs VII 1167 Und Die Grundlegung Oberschwabens Im Mittelalter (From the Guelphs to the Staufers. The Death of Welfs VII 1167 and the Foundation of Upper Swabia in the Middle Ages): Volume 4. Kohlhammer, Stuttgart 2020. ISBN 978-3-17-037334-1.

Margraves of Tuscany
Dukes of Spoleto
House of Welf
1130s births
1167 deaths

Year of birth uncertain